Collins Street Baptist Church is a Baptist church in central Melbourne, Victoria, Australia. It is affiliated with the [[[Australian Baptist Ministries]]. Founded in 1843, it is the oldest Baptist church in Victoria and the oldest continuous Baptist church in Australia.

History
The first Baptist service in Melbourne was held in 1838 in a tent on a vacant allotment of land opposite the present church and where the Regent Theatre now stands. The first chapel was built on the current site in 1845. In the late 1850s it was decided to enlarge the building. The current church, opened in 1862, was designed by Joseph Reed, the architect who designed the Melbourne Town Hall and several other prominent Melbourne churches. Unlike most Melbourne churches of the period, which are either Gothic or Romanesque, Collins Street Baptist is in the form of a classical temple, with four Corinthian columns facing the street. According to the church's website, this "reflects the Baptist understanding of the church as a gathered community of believers rather than as a special building".

Building

In conformity with the Baptist dislike of decoration in churches, the interior has plain plastered walls. It has arched moulded windows, a double aisle and side seats facing the pulpit. A central raised pulpit emphasises the stress in Baptist theology on the Word of God being read and preached as central features of the services of worship. Seating is arranged in a "U" shape around the central axis determined by the pulpit and the Communion table. There is no form of decoration other than some detail in the windows and carving on the pulpit and Communion furniture. Traditionally, no cross or symbol appears in the church though that has changed today.

Early Baptist tradition also disapproved of music in churches, but in 1854 a small organ was installed. In 1885 a larger organ was installed which was restored and expanded in 1974.

The church also owned land at 203 Little Collins Street, on which a nine-storey building was erected; the ground floor houses the Baptist Central Hall, seating 350 persons, and used for church and public functions.

People
Ronald Ham, appointed in 1981, was the first Australian-born minister of the church. Rowena Curtis, appointed in 2000, was the first woman. Tim Costello joined the pastoral team in 2005 to provide leadership to the church's Urban Mission Unit, later known as Urban Seed. 

In 2010, Simon Carey Holt became pastor and continues in the role today.  Holt was previously a faculty member of Whitley College, a Baptist theological college in Melbourne, teaching in spirituality, ethics and pastoral theology. He is the author of several books including God Next Door: Spirituality and Mission in the Neighbourhood (2007), Eating Heaven: Spirituality at the Table (2013) and Heaven All Around Us: Discovering God in Everyday Life (2018). 

Several historically notable people have been members of the church. During the early 20th century numerous women active in the Victorian women's movement were members, including Cecilia Downing, Margaret McLean and Bessie Rees. The politicians Denis Lovegrove and Robert Reid were members as were the prominent Melbourne Syme family including the owner of The Age newspaper, David Syme.

References

External links
Official website

Baptist churches in Melbourne
Churches completed in 1862
19th-century Baptist churches
Heritage-listed buildings in Melbourne
1845 establishments in Australia
Collins Street, Melbourne
Buildings and structures in Melbourne City Centre